Tótem  is a 2023 Mexican-French-Danish co-production drama film written and directed by Lila Avilés. The film depicts the story of Seven-year-old Sol, who is spending the day at her grandfather's home, for a surprise party for Sol's father, Tonatiuh. As daylight fades, Sol comes to understand that her world is about to change dramatically. It is selected to compete for the Golden Bear at the 73rd Berlin International Film Festival, where it had its world premiere on 20 February 2023.

Synopsis
Sol, a seven-year-old girl goes to     her grandfather's home, where her aunts Nuri and Alejandra are throwing a surprise birthday party for her father. Probably his last, so in a sense it is also a farewell ceremony. With the onset of dusk an unfamiliar and unrestraint atmosphere takes over, breaking the family bonds. For Sol the world is about to change as she learns, the essence of letting go and feel of the breath of life.

Cast

 Naíma Sentíes as Sol
  as Nuri
  as Alejandra
 Saori Gurza as Esther
 Teresita Sánchez as Cruz
 Mateo García Elizondo as Tonatiuh
 Juan Francisco Maldonado as Napo
 Iazua Larios as Lucía
 Alberto Amador as Roberto

Production
On 7 July 2020, it was reported that Lila Avilés is planning for her new film titled as Tótem. The film was also among five upcoming feature projects to receive grant of 53,000 (60,000) from the Hubert Bals Fund (HBF), administered by the International Film Festival Rotterdam.

Tótem is produced by Limerencia Films and Laterna, in co-production with Danish firm Paloma Productions and France's Alpha Violet Production, who are also distributors. It is the
second feature film of Lila Avilés after The Chambermaid. Naíma Sentíes as Sol, Montserrat Marañon as Nuri, Marisol Gasé as Alejandrato and Mateo García Elizondo as Sol's father Tonatiuh are cast in main roles.

Reception

On the review aggregator Rotten Tomatoes website, the film has an approval rating of 100% based on 14 reviews, with an average rating of 7.7/10. On Metacritic, it has a weighted average score of 86 out of 100 based on 6 reviews, indicating "Universal Acclaim".

Stephen Saito for Moveable Fest wrote in review that "A thrillingly vital family portrait about a clan that does its very best to celebrate someone they’re about to mourn. Jonathan Romney reviewing for Screen International wrote, "This thematically rich piece offers a set of vivid character studies, while musing on life, death and time – largely from a child’s perspective." Marina Ashioti writing in Little White Lies stated, "A tender spirit of warmth and levity permeates the screen, sustaining a buoyancy that keeps the film from sinking into mawkish waters." Fabien Lemercier reviewing for Cineuropa praised the film and wrote, "It’s a film full of life and soul and a modestly deceptive work, for its significance is enormous."

Accolades

Notes

References

External links

 
 Tótem at Berlinale
 Tótem at Alpha Violet 
 

2023 films
Mexican drama films
2020s Mexican films
French drama films
2020s Spanish-language films
Danish drama films